C. E. Parcell was an American architect.  His work includes the Ybor Factory Building and worker housing, now a historic site located in Tampa, Florida, United States, added to the U.S. National Register of Historic Places on November 15, 1972.

Gallery

References

1800s births
Place of birth unknown
1900s deaths
Place of death unknown
19th-century American architects